This is a list of members of the South Australian House of Assembly from 1975 to 1977, as elected at the 1975 state election:

 The Country Party renamed itself to the National Country Party during the course of this term.. 
 The Liberal Movement voted to rejoin the Liberal Party in May 1976, with one of its two MHAs, David Boundy, following suit. The second MHA, Robin Millhouse, who had fiercely opposed the merger, immediately founded a new party, the New LM, and served as its sole representative in the House of Assembly.

Members of South Australian parliaments by term
20th-century Australian politicians